Blauwestad is a village in the municipality of Oldambt in the Netherlands. It is situated on the east bank of the Oldambtmeer in the east of the province of Groningen.

History 
After the Oldambtmeer was created in 2005, the village of Blauwestad started to be developed. The first inhabitants settled in the village in 2006.

Geography 
Blauwestad is north of Winschoten, east of Scheemda, southeast of Midwolda, south of Oostwold, southwest of Finsterwolde, and west of Beerta. It was created in and on the eastern bank of the artificial lake Oldambtmeer.

References

External links 
 
 Blauwestad, project website

Oldambt (municipality)
Populated places in Groningen (province)